Jérôme Haehnel was the defending champion, but did not participate.

Ivan Ljubičić won the title, defeating Gaël Monfils 7–6(9–7), 6–0 in the final.

Seeds

Draw

Finals

Top half

Bottom half

References

External links
 Main draw
 Qualifying draw

Open de Moselle - Singles
2005 Open de Moselle